The Serie A is the women's premier futsal championship in Italy, is operated by the Divisione Calcio a 5. It was founded in 1994, which is played under UEFA rules and currently consists of two groups of 12 teams.

Champions by year

2011-12: Pro Reggina
2012-12: AZ Gold
2013-14: Lazio
2014-15: Ternana

References

External links
Official Website
Futsalplanet

 

Serie A
Italy
1994 establishments in Italy
Sports leagues established in 1994
Women's sports leagues in Italy